Lindsay/Kawartha Lakes Municipal Airport  is a registered aerodrome located  west northwest of Lindsay, Ontario, Canada. The aerodrome is home to mostly general aviation aircraft, the COPA Flight 101 Kawartha Lakes Flying Club, and maintenance and service facilities. Kawartha Lakes Aerodrome is also used by Ornge as a refueling stop, and is a popular fly-in lunch destination for pilots in central Ontario.

References

External links
 Official website
 Page about this airport on COPA's Places to Fly airport directory

Registered aerodromes in Ontario